Raymond Elton Hayes (December 17, 1905 – July 30, 1986) was an American professional basketball player. He played in the National Basketball League for the Chicago Bruins in four games during the 1939–40 season and averaged 0.8 points per game. He later worked at Socony Vacuum Oil Company and coached high school basketball and baseball.

References

1905 births
1986 deaths
American men's basketball players
Basketball coaches from Illinois
Basketball players from Illinois
Chicago Bruins players
Chicago Maroons men's basketball players
Forwards (basketball)
Guards (basketball)
High school baseball coaches in the United States
High school basketball coaches in the United States
People from Chenoa, Illinois